Alexandru Adrian Dandea (born 23 January 1988) is a Romanian footballer who plays as a central defender for Minaur Baia Mare.

Honours
Astra Giurgiu
 Liga I (1): 2015–16
 Supercupa României (1): 2016

External links
 
 

1988 births
Living people
People from Drăgășani
Romanian footballers
Association football defenders
Association football central defenders
Liga I players
Liga II players
SCM Râmnicu Vâlcea players
CSM Câmpia Turzii players
CS Turnu Severin players
FC Dinamo București players
CS Sportul Snagov players
FC Astra Giurgiu players
FC Hermannstadt players
FC Rapid București players
CSC 1599 Șelimbăr players
CS Minaur Baia Mare (football) players
Ukrainian Premier League players
FC Hoverla Uzhhorod players
Romanian expatriate footballers
Expatriate footballers in Ukraine
Romanian expatriate sportspeople in Ukraine